The 2020 El Paso Locomotive FC season was the second season for El Paso Locomotive FC in the USL Championship (USL-C), the second-tier professional soccer league in the United States and Canada. This article covers the period from November 18, 2019, the day after the 2019 USL-C Playoff Final, to the conclusion of the 2020 USL-C Playoff Final, scheduled for November 12–16, 2020.

Club

Roster

Competitions

Exhibitions

USL Championship

Standings — Group C

Match results
On December 20, 2019, the USL announced the 2020 season schedule, creating the following fixture list for the early part of El Paso's season.

In the preparations for the resumption of league play following the shutdown prompted by the COVID-19 pandemic, the remainder of El Paso's schedule was announced on July 2.

USL Championship Playoffs

U.S. Open Cup 

As a USL Championship club, El Paso will enter the competition in the Second Round, to be played April 7–9. It was announced on 29 January that their first opponent would be NISA side Detroit City FC.

References

El Paso Locomotive FC
El Paso
El Paso
El Paso Locomotive